The UEFA U-17 Championship 2007 qualifying round was the first round of qualifications for the main tournament of the 2007 UEFA European Under-17 Championship. Top two teams from each group and the best third-placed team entered the 2007 UEFA European Under-17 Championship elite round.

Matches

Group 1

Group 2

Group 3

Group 4

Group 5

Group 6

Group 7

Group 8

Group 9

Group 10

Group 11

Group 12

3rd place table
The best third-placed team was determined by the results against the top two teams of the same group.

// bye this round,  as host, elite round bye.

Qualification
UEFA European Under-17 Championship qualification